Wander is a given name. Notable people with the name include:

Wander dos Santos Machado (born 1976), Brazilian footballer
Wander Franco (born 2001), Dominican baseball player
Wander Gross (born 1978), Aruban footballer
Wander Johannes de Haas (1878–1960), Dutch physicist and mathematician
Wander Lowie (born 1959), Dutch linguist
Wander Luiz Queiroz Dias (born 1992), Brazilian footballer
Wander Luiz Bitencourt Junior (born 1987), Brazilian footballer
Wander Mateo (born 1989), Dominican judoka
Wander Moura (born 1969), Brazilian runner
Wander Suero (born 1991), Dominican baseball player

See also
Wander (disambiguation)